Barrington College was a four-year Christian liberal arts college located in Barrington, Rhode Island. It is no longer in operation.

History
Barrington College was founded by E. W. Kenyon, pastor of the New Covenant Baptist Church, in 1900 as the Bethel Bible Training School in Spencer, Massachusetts. It was relocated to Dudley, Massachusetts in 1923 and renamed the Dudley Bible Institute. It was then moved to Capitol Hill in Providence, Rhode Island in 1929 and renamed the Providence Bible Institute. In 1950, the school purchased Belton Court, a  estate in Barrington. In 1960, the Providence campus was sold and the college was renamed to Barrington College. Financially struggling to continue operation after 85 years, the college merged with Gordon College, another liberal arts Christian school in Wenham, Massachusetts, in 1985.

Legacy
The Barrington Center for the Arts at Gordon is named in honor of Barrington College. The campus was sold and was the site of Zion Bible College, until Zion moved to Haverhill, Massachusetts 2008.

Notable people
 William Stuart Hamilton Cameron: Alumnus; Council President, Somerville, New Jersey (1978–82); President/CEO New Jersey Bankers Association, Princeton (1987–2006)
 David G. Horner: Alumnus, former president, current president of American College of Greece
 Doug Kane: member of the Illinois House of Representatives
 Woodrow M. Kroll: Alumnus, former president of Practical Bible College, current president of the Back to the Bible radio ministry
 Harold Hoehner: Professor of New Testament, Dallas Theological Seminary
 Ronald H. Nash: Professor of Philosophy, Religion, and Theology.
 John Mbiti: alumnus; Professor of Philosophy, University of Bern
 Shirley Nelson: Alumna, lecturer in creative writing, award-winning author

Notes and references

Defunct Christian universities and colleges
Defunct private universities and colleges in Rhode Island
Educational institutions established in 1900
Gordon College (Massachusetts)
Buildings and structures in Barrington, Rhode Island
Educational institutions disestablished in 1985
1900 establishments in Rhode Island
1985 disestablishments in Rhode Island